The Tri-Valley-San Joaquin Valley Regional Rail Authority is a special-purpose district body formed for the sole purpose of providing a public transit connection, known as Valley Link, between broad-gauge Bay Area Rapid Transit (BART) and standard-gauge Altamont Corridor Express (ACE) services, in Northern California.

In its initial phase, Valley Link is a planned  rail project to connect the existing end-of-track Dublin/Pleasanton BART station with the ACE North Lathrop station, using standard-gauge electro-diesel multiple unit vehicles.

History

About  of the First transcontinental railroad right of way through the Tri-Valley and Altamont Pass, originally established in 1869 by the old Western Pacific Railroad, was deeded to Alameda County by Southern Pacific Railroad in 1984. The Altamont Commuter Express commuter rail service, which began between Stockton and San Jose in 1998, uses the other Union Pacific right of way that goes over Altamont Pass, established in 1908.

A similar plan to run diesel multiple unit trains across Altamont Pass was proposed by BART in 2003, though it comprised a larger service area (continuing north along the Iron Horse Regional Trail, a former Southern Pacific right-of-way).

In 2017, citing lack of interest from the Bay Area Rapid Transit District in bringing BART service directly to Livermore, the Livermore City Council proposed a newly established local entity to undertake planning and construction of the extension, which was also recommended by the California State Assembly Transportation Committee. Assembly Bill 758 was signed by Governor of California Jerry Brown on October 13, 2017, formally establishing the Authority.

On May 24, 2018, the BART board voted against a full rapid transit BART build or a bus rapid transit system to extend service east from Dublin/Pleasanton station. This prompted the new Rail Authority to initiate planning of a new transit system.

A final feasibility report was released in October 2019. The buildout cost to North Lathrop was estimated at between $1.88 billion and $3.21 billion, with an expected start of operations between the second quarter of 2027 and the fourth quarter of 2028. Scott Haggerty, one of the founders of the TVSJVRRA, noted that the popularity of the project was reflected in the volume of public comments to the feasibility report. A draft environmental impact report was released in December 2020. The final environmental impact report was approved by the board in May 2021, allowing the rail authority to proceed with design and continue seeking funding for the project.

Rail service
Valley Link is a plan to utilize diesel multiple units or electric multiple units along the former First transcontinental railroad right-of-way through the Altamont Pass and in the Interstate 580 median through the city of Livermore. Trains would initially run  from the ACE North Lathrop station to the Dublin/Pleasanton BART station with stops in the Tracy area and potential transfer stations with ACE at Greenville Road in Livermore and North Lathrop. Weekday service would connect to every other BART train at Dublin/Pleasanton.

The developer of River Islands has offered to cover the cost of station construction in exchange for the ability to build a transit village at the site.

In 2018, Stadler met with the governing board to discuss traction sources; diesel multiple unit or diesel / battery electric hybrid vehicles will likely serve the route. AECOM was contracted to perform a feasibility study for the project that same year. The loading gauge of highway underpasses limits the selection of rolling stock.

The San Joaquin Regional Rail Commission agreed to operate the service in 2020.

Plans, are for opening 2027 at earliest,running east from Dublin/Pleasanton station.

Funding
Funds previously allocated to BART to construct a Livermore extension were forfeited to this authority by July 1, 2018, amounting to at least $145 million. Funding for the feasibility study was provided variously by Caltrans, Metropolitan Transportation Commission, and the San Joaquin County Council of Governments. By February 2019, more than $588 million had been accumulated for the project. In 2020, the project gained a further $400 million from reallocated BART funds.

Stations

The following are initial planned stations along the route:

Infill stations at Ellis and Grant Line Road may be added in the future. The second phase is planned to extend the line north to Stockton.

References

External links
Official website of Valley Link Rail

Valley Link
Proposed railway lines in California
2017 establishments in California
Railway lines in highway medians
Railway companies established in 2017
2028 in rail transport